The Teatro San Moisè was a theatre and opera house in Venice, active from 1620 to 1818. It was in a prominent location near the Palazzo Giustinian and the church of San Moisè at the entrance to the Grand Canal.

History
Built by the San Bernaba branch of the Giustiniani family c.1620, it was originally a prose theatre. Its first opera production was Claudio Monteverdi's (now lost) opera L'Arianna in 1640 by which time the ownership had passed to the Zane family who had long intermarried with the Giustiniani. It was used by the Ferrari company, and the librettist Giovanni Faustini was one of the theatre's first impresarios.

From the outset it was one of the smaller theatres of Venice, but also one of the most influential. In 1668 it was enlarged to 800 seats, although this did not result in a significant increase on the size of the stage which limited the theatre's ability to stage large-scale productions throughout its existence. In 1674 theatre was revived by the impresario Francesco Santurini, who caused a revolution by halving the price of tickets to 2 lire, leading to an opera 'boom' and a further proliferation of active theatres in the city.

During the early 18th century Gasparini, Vivaldi and Albinoni were all active in San Moisè. During the 1740s, Neapolitan opera buffa reached Venice and San Moisè was one of the first theatres to concentrate on this genre, with works by Baldassare Galuppi, in partnership with Carlo Goldoni, being seen in the theatre. This trend continued through most of the century. In the 1770s and 1780s the theatre was under the control of the prolific librettist Giovanni Bertati, the Poeta Cesareo ("Imperial Poet") of the Italian Opera in Vienna, who concentrated on drammi giocosi with Pasquale Anfossi and other composers.

The San Moisè finally closed in 1818 after producing a series of farse by Rossini. It later re-opened as a puppet theatre and was known as the Teatro Minerva. In July 1896, the Minerva saw Venice's first cinema projection when the Lumière brothers brought their equipment to the theatre. It was still being used as a cinema in 1906 but was later demolished. By the end of the 20th century the site was occupied by a shop and a block of flats.

Premieres at the theatre
1642: L'amore innamorato by Francesco Cavalli
1649: L'Euripo by Francesco Cavalli
1685: Clearco in Negroponte by Domenico Gabrielli
1716: La costanza trionfante degl'amori e de gl'odii by Vivaldi
1717: Tieteberga by Vivaldi
1718: Artabano, re dei Parti by Vivaldi
1718: Armida al campo d'Egitto by Vivaldi
1718: Gl’inganni per vendetta by Vivaldi
1750: Il mondo nella luna by Baldassare Galuppi
1757: Merope by Florian Leopold Gassmann
1758: Issipile by Leopold Gassmann
1759: Gli uccellatori by Leopold Gassmann
1760: Filosofia in amore by Leopold Gassmann
1762: Un pazzo ne fa cento by Leopold Gassmann
1765: L'amore in ballo by Giovanni Paisiello
1766: Le serve rivali by Tommaso Traetta 
1773: L'innocente fortunata by Giovanni Paisiello
1774: Le nozze in contrasto by Giovanni Valentini
1775: La contadina incivilita by Pasquale Anfossi
1775: Didone abbandonata by Pasquale Anfossi
1775: L'avaro by Pasquale Anfossi
1776: Le nozze disturbate by Giovanni Paisiello
1777: Lo sposo disperato by Pasquale Anfossi
1778: Ezio by Pasquale Anfossi
1778: La forza delle donne by Pasquale Anfossi
1779: Azor Re di Kibinga by Pasquale Anfossi
1781: Gli amanti canuti by Pasquale Anfossi
1781: Il trionfo di Arianna by Pasquale Anfossi
1787: L'orfanella americana by Pasquale Anfossi
1787: Don Giovanni Tenorio by Giuseppe Gazzaniga
1801: Martino Carbonaro by Giuseppe Gazzaniga
1802: Le metamorfosi di Pasquale by Gaspare Spontini
1810: Adelina by Pietro Generali
1810: La cambiale di matrimonio by Gioachino Rossini
1811: L'equivoco stravagante by Gioachino Rossini
1812: L'inganno felice by Gioachino Rossini
1812: La scala di seta by Gioachino Rossini
1812: L'occasione fa il ladro by Gioachino Rossini
1813: Il signor Bruschino by Gioachino Rossini
1815: Bettina vedova by Giovanni Pacini

See also
 Opera houses and theatres in Venice

References

Zoppelli, Luca (1992), 'Venice' in The New Grove Dictionary of Opera, ed. Stanley Sadie (London) 

Theatres in Venice
San Moise
Theatres completed in 1640
Music venues completed in 1640
1640 establishments in the Republic of Venice
1640 establishments in Italy